This is a list of mockumentaries. Mockumentary or mock documentary is a genre of film and television, a parody presented as a documentary recording real life.

Film

 The 1 Up Fever, mockumentary about Bitcoin and augmented reality video games.
 2gether (2000), spoof of boy bands like N*Sync and The Backstreet Boys.
 7 Days in Hell (2015), a fictional documentary-style exposé on the rivalry between two of the greatest tennis players of all time who battled it out in a 2001 match that lasted seven days.
 ABBA: The Movie (1977), mockumentary comedy-drama film about the Swedish pop group ABBA's Australian tour.
 AIC 23 (2013), mockumentary about Film Studies professor Alan Poole McLard on his journey to make a documentary about Alice in Chains interviewing other musicians who have been influenced by the band.
 All You Need Is Cash (aka The Rutles, 1978); an updated version (2002), a parody of music documentaries using a fictional counterpart of The Beatles.
 The Atomic Cafe (1982), a black humor satire about the threat of nuclear war using only a broad range of archival material from the 1940s to 1960s.
 Auditions (1978), mockumentary about the porn industry.
 BabaKiueria (1986), an Australian film on the reversed relations between Aboriginal Australians and European Australians.
 The Baby Formula (2009), about a couple of two lesbian women who both get pregnant through an experimental stem cell procedure.
 Behind the Mask: The Rise of Leslie Vernon (2005), in which a film crew follows around a serial killer in training.
 Believe (2007), the story of multi-level marketing and a failed pyramid scheme.
 Best in Show (2000), about the contestants at a national dog show; one of several mockumentaries written and directed by Christopher Guest.
 The Big Tease (1999), a Scottish hairdresser's journey to the U.S. for a hairdressing competition, filmed with mockumentary elements.
 Bob Roberts (1992), Tim Robbins satiric film about a right-wing folk singer's crooked election campaign.
 Borat: Cultural Learnings of America for Make Benefit Glorious Nation of Kazakhstan (2006), Sacha Baron Cohen's outrageous depiction of an over-the-top Kazakh journalist's journey through the United States.
 Borat Subsequent Moviefilm: Delivery of Prodigious Bribe to American Regime for Make Benefit Once Glorious Nation of Kazakhstan (2020), the sequel to Borat, which depicts the title character's second journey to the USA, with an attempt to arrange a marriage between his daughter and a senior member of the GOP.
 The Boys & Girls Guide to Getting Down (2006), a fictional guide to teach inexperienced youth about all things involved with "getting down", while also pointing out some of the pitfalls associated with the party lifestyle.
 Brick Madness (2020), about a LEGO tournament called Brickathon and a documentary crew that interviews the contestants.
 Brothers of the Head (2005), the story of two conjoined twins (played by real-life twin actors Harry and Luke Treadaway) who form a punk rock band.
 Brüno (2009), about Sacha Baron Cohen's gay Austrian fashion journalist in a journey through the United States.
 Bucky and the Squirrels (2016), about a rock band that gets frozen in ice in 1968 after a plane crash in the Alps, and is brought back to life 50 years later.
 Burn Hollywood Burn (1998), about a movie director who prevents severe editing of his latest film by stealing it.
 The Calcium Kid (2004), boxing documentary charting the unexpected rise to fame of a milkman who is an amateur boxer.
 The Canadian Conspiracy (1985), about a supposed Canadian plan to subvert the United States by taking over its media.
 CB4 (1993), "rapumentary" starring Chris Rock about the story of a fictional group loosely based on N.W.A and 2 Live Crew.
 Chalk (2007), the experience of three teachers and one assistant principal over the course of an entire school year.
 The Clowns (1970), Federico Fellini's larger-than-life portrait of the art of clownery.
 Comic Book: The Movie (2004), direct-to-DVD release about a comic book fanboy dealing with the unfaithful film adaptation of his favorite character, set to the backdrop of the 2002 San Diego Comic-Con.
 Confessions of a Porn Addict (2008), about a man's quest to get his wife back after she left him for being addicted to porn.
 Confetti (2006), British mockumentary about a fashion magazine wedding competition.
 C.S.A.: The Confederate States of America (2004), an alternate history take in which the Confederate States of America won the American Civil War.
 Dark Side of the Moon (2002), a French mockumentary portraying the moon landing as staged in a movie lot by Stanley Kubrick.
 David Holzman's Diary (1967), a false autobiography by Jim McBride, which interrogates the art of documentary-making.
 A Day Without a Mexican (2004), a fantasy satire in which all Mexicans in California suddenly disappear.
 Death to 2020 (2020), British mockumentary by Black Mirror creators Charlie Brooker and Annabel Jones which features a series of fictional characters discussing US and UK events of 2020 including the COVID-19 pandemic and US presidential election.
 The Delicate Art of Parking (2003), Canadian mockumentary about parking enforcement officers.
 Dill Scallion (1999), about the rise and fall of a country-western singer, much in the way of This Is Spinal Tap.
 District 9 (2009) includes elements of mockumentary in depicting the struggles of an alien species living in immigrant camps in Johannesburg.
 Drop Dead Gorgeous (1999), a camera crew follows a beauty pageant contestants in a small town in Minnesota.
  (1992) – Russian mockumentary about the events of the early 20th century.
 Electric Apricot: Quest for Festeroo (2008), Les Claypool plays the role of drummer-singer Lapland "Lapdog" Miclovik of rising jam-band Electric Apricot, heading to the holy grail of festivals, Festeroo.
 Everybody Dies by the End (2022), a film crew follows a cult director for the creation of his final picture.
 The Falls (1980), by Peter Greenaway, documenting the cases of 92 victims of the fictional VUE (violent unknown event).
 Farce of the Penguins (2007), direct-to-video parody of March of the Penguins.
 Fear of a Black Hat (1994), the story of the fictional rap group Niggaz with Hats (N.W.H.), as it evolves alongside the genre, from its popular origins to the advent of gangsta rap.
 Fellowship of the Dice (2005), story of a first time gamer's introduction to the role-playing game world.
 Finishing the Game (2007), depicting the search for "a new Bruce Lee" to finish The Game of Death.
Fire-Up (2020), French conspiracy mockumentary about Firefighters parodying Hold-up.
 First on the Moon (2005), Russian mockumentary about a fictional 1930s Soviet landing on the Moon.
 The Flying Scissors (2009), following a handful of individuals preparing for a rock-paper-scissors competition.
 For Your Consideration (2006), about three actors finding their film is generating Oscar buzz; one of several mockumentaries written and directed by Christopher Guest.
 Forgotten Silver (1995), Peter Jackson's fictional documentary about a "forgotten" New Zealand pioneer filmmaker.
 FUBAR (2002, with sequel in 2010), about two members of the head-banger subculture.
 Fudge 44 (2005), an Irish mockumentary about six puppets in a financially impoverished children's puppet theater in Tokyo, who locals believe came to life and robbed a nearby bank to avoid being put out of business.
 G-SALE (2003), mockumentary about garage sale fanatics.
 Gamers: The Movie (2006), about players trying to set a record playing a Dungeons and Dragons-like game.
 Get Ready to be Boyzvoiced (2000), following fictional Norwegian boy band Boyzvoice.
 The Gods Must be Crazy (1980, with sequel in 1989), a South African comedy presented and narrated in the manner of a nature documentary.
 Good Arrows (2009), about a Welsh darts player.
 Hard Core Logo (1996), the final tour of an aged punk band, as a model for the death of "true" punk rock.
 The Heavenly Kings (2006), follows the fictional Cantopop boy band Alive, fronted by Daniel Wu, who also directed the film.
 A Hole in My Heart (2004), about a man who films a porn in his apartment with the help of a friend and an attention-seeking starlet.
 Houston, We Have a Problem! (film) (2016), about the Yugoslavia space program sold to the USA.
 I'm Still Here (2010), satirical film parodying America's fascination with the reality television phenomenon of the 2000s; revolves around the life of Academy Award-nominated actor Joaquin Phoenix; disheveled and perpetually clothed in dark suits and sunglasses, he announces his retirement from acting in favor of a career as a professional hip-hop artist.
 Incident at Loch Ness (2004), about a filmmaker (Werner Herzog, who's also writer and producer for the film) attempting to make a documentary about the mythological Loch Ness Monster while a documentary about his life is, in turn, being filmed.
 Interview with the Assassin (2002), about a cameraman who obtains the confession of the actual assassin who shot John F Kennedy.
 It's All Gone Pete Tong (2004), comedy following the tragic life of legendary DJ Frankie Wilde; takes us through Wilde's life from being one of the best DJs alive, through subsequent battle with a hearing disorder, culminating in his mysterious disappearance from the scene.
 The Invisible Life of Thomas Lynch (2009), dark comedy about a lonely small time hit man (Steve Stanulis) Shot documentary style, the film reveals a pathetically empty and misguided man and the callousness of the film makers who just want to get the shots, unmoved by torture and murder. The contradiction between personal life and job, and the apathy of the people making the documentary reflects satirically the dispassion of the media. Directed by James Merendino Lisa Hammer 
 Jackie's Back (1999), comedy chronicle of the life and career of Jackie Washington (Jenifer Lewis), a 1960s/1970s R&B diva as the diva/singer vies for another comeback.
 Kenny (2006), the life of a portable toilet installer in Melbourne, Australia.
Killing Gunther (2017), about a group of disgruntled and eccentric assassins banding together to kill the world's greatest hitman, Gunther (Arnold Schwarzenegger).
 The Last Polka (1985), John Candy and Eugene Levy mockumentary about the last concert of the Shmenge Brothers, a Leutonian polka duet whose characters were first developed on Second City Television.
 LolliLove (2004), a story about a husband and wife team, played by James Gunn and Jenna Fischer, who form a charity to give each homeless person a lollipop with a cheery slogan on the wrapper, but who are really only serving themselves.
 The Making of '...And God Spoke' (1994), a mockumentary about the filming of a low budget film on the Bible
 Man Bites Dog (1992), Belgian black comedy/satire in which a film crew follows a serial killer documenting his crimes.
 Man of the Year (1995), a satirical look directed by former Playgirl magazine Man of the Year Dirk Shafer, about his Man of the Year reign as a closeted gay man.
 Mascots (2016), Netflix film about the competition for the World Mascot Association's Gold Fluffy Award.
 Medusa: Dare to Be Truthful (1992), "behind the scenes" exposé of fictional pop singer and sex symbol Medusa, on her "Blonde Leading the Blonde" concert tour.
 A Mighty Wind (2003), the story of three groups of folk singers who come together at a tribute concert in honor of their recently deceased manager; one of several mockumentaries written and directed by Christopher Guest.
 Mike Bassett: England Manager (2001), the fortunes of a lackluster England football manager in the World Cup.
 Mister America (2019), Tim Heidecker plays a fictionalized version of himself running for a district attorney position in order to unseat the incumbent who previously attempted to imprison him on a mass murder charge.
 Morris: A Life with Bells On (2009), British spoof documentary about morris dancing.
 The Mother of Invention (2009), comedy following a failed inventor and his successful rival competing for an annual young inventor's award.
 Mutant Swinger from Mars (2009), A long lost 1950s sci-fi film (spoof) that opens with a 10-minute "documentary/mockumentary" about the long lost film and the director, Orton Z. Creswell. The film features Jack White and is a homage to Young Frankenstein, Jerry Lewis The Nutty Professor, and the films of Edward D. Wood.
 Never Been Thawed (2005), about people who collect frozen TV dinners.
 The Old Negro Space Program (2004), short subject in the style of a Ken Burns film; subtitled "the shocking but false story of America's blackstronauts", it depicts the fictional "Negro American Space Society of Astronauts" (NASSA), lampooning racial segregation in the United States and in particular the Negro leagues.
 The Nona Tapes (1995), mock short documentary about the band Alice in Chains.
 On the Ropes (2011), about a rivalry between a boxing gym and martial arts school.
 Paranormal Entity (2009), about a widowed family that are believed to be haunted by a demon.
 Popstar: Never Stop Never Stopping (2016), follows Conner4Real (Andy Samberg), a parody of Justin Bieber in the style of a typical concert documentary.
 Punishment Park (1971), a pseudo-documentary set in the U.S.A. purporting to be a film crews's news coverage of a team of soldiers escorting a group of hippies, draft dodgers, and anti-establishment types across the desert in a mix of punishment and game.
 Real Life (1979), mock documentary directed by Albert Brooks about a year in the life of an average American family (headed by Charles Grodin); it spoofs the PBS-style documentaries.
Reboot Camp (2020), a mockumentary by Ivo Raza, about a fake self help group full of Hollywood celebrities that turns into a cult
 Shooting Bokkie (2003), about a South African film crew creating a documentary on a 13-year-old assassin (a bokkie) and the people living in the impoverished and crime-ridden area of Cape Flats.
 Sons of Provo (2004), musical mockumentary about a Mormon boy-band and its rise to local fame in Utah.
 State of Bacon (2013), about all things bacon, including the world's largest festival dedicated to bacon, the men who put it on, and some fun folks who attend.
 Steamin' and Dreamin': The Grandmaster Cash Story (2009), comedy that follows the exploits of Cork hip-hop artist Grandmaster Cash.
 Street Thief (2006), The movie follows the life of Chicago burglar Kaspar Karr. Kaspar cases and robs stores. He counts up his score and a small interview follows where Kaspar introduces himself. He shows his expertise in social engineering, stalking, and intelligence gathering and discusses his careful, meticulous planning cycles.
 Surf's Up, animated mockumentary that follows the progress of a surfer penguin as he enters a surfing competition.
 Sweet and Lowdown (1999), by Woody Allen and starring Sean Penn, includes elements of mockumentary depicting the life of a fictional jazz guitarist from the 1930s.
 Take the Money and Run (1969), the second film ever directed by Woody Allen, in which Allen plays an ambitious but clumsy burglar.
 Tanner '88 (1988, with a follow-up sequel in 2004), the campaign of fictional former Michigan U.S. representative Jack Tanner in his bid to secure the Democratic party's nomination for President; written by Garry Trudeau, directed by Robert Altman.
 This Is Spinal Tap (1984), a film crew follows a British hard rock band attempting to revive their popularity; the first of several mockumentaries written by Christopher Guest.
 Tour de Pharmacy (2017), an HBO mockumentary that chronicles doping in the professional cycling world.
 The Tunnel (2011), a documentary crew encounters a ghoul in the tunnels below Sydney.
 Waiting for Guffman (1996), a small Missouri town's celebration of its sesquicentennial; one of several mockumentaries written and directed by Christopher Guest.
 We Make Movies (2017), about an egotistical student filmmaker who gathers his friends together to help make a movie for their local film festival.
 What We Do in the Shadows (2014), comedy-horror film about a group of vampires sharing a flat in Wellington, New Zealand.
World War III (1998), a German film depicting what might have transpired if, following the overthrow of Mikhail Gorbachev, Soviet troops, under orders from a new hard-line regime, had opened fire on demonstrators in Berlin in the fall of 1989 and precipitated World War III.
 Zelig (1983), by Woody Allen, about a man who changes his physical appearance in order to fit in.

 Television 

 Series 

 30 minuten (NL, 1995–1997), follows a different fictional character each week, played by Arjan Ederveen.
 Abbott Elementary (US, 2021–present) follows a group of teachers in a low budget elementary school in Philadelphia.
 All Aussie Adventures (AU, 2001), follows the Australian outback adventures of Russell Coight, who believes he is one with the land but constantly has mishaps that could only happen to him.
 American Horror Story: Roanoke (US, 2016) follows supernatural experiences around a haunted house and its surroundings in North Carolina. The first half of the season is presented as a paranormal documentary entitled My Roanoke Nightmare, which reenacts the experiences of a married couple who lived in the house. The second half s presented as found footage and depicts the doomed production of the documentary's sequel.
 American Vandal (US, 2017–2018) follows an amateur high school filmmaker who believes an expelled senior may be innocent of vandalizing the school with penis drawings.
 Angry Boys (Australia, 2011), created by Chris Lilley.
 Arrested Development (US, 2003–2006, 2013–2019), a fly-on-the-wall series filmed in mockumentary style; follows the story of the dysfunctional Bluth family, primarily Michael, after his father is imprisoned.
 Art Less (USA, 2016), an online web series; follows a group of teenagers who want to be famous, but don't have the drive to succeed.
 Brass Eye (UK, 1997), series of mockumentaries by Chris Morris.
 Come Fly with Me (UK, 2010), fly-on-the-wall comedy which follows the antics of many characters on a normal day at a UK airport; most characters are played by comedian duo David Walliams and Matt Lucas.
 Cunk On Britain (UK, 2016-2018), a comedy series created by and starring Diane Morgan as Philomena Cunk, a dim-witted and ill-informed interviewer who travels Britain interviewing various specialists and historians. Most of the time Philomena seems vapid and unbothered, entirely missing the point of most interviews. Aired on the BBC.
 Cunk On Earth (UK, 2022), a comedy series created by and starring Diane Morgan as Philomena Cunk, who travels the earth interviewing historians and specialists about humanity's greatest inventions and works. As with the other "Cunk" series, her questions are often misguided and have no relevance, she often misinterprets main ideas, and her humor parodies David Attenborough and Brian Cox.
 The Day Today (UK, 1994), spoof news series created by Chris Morris and Armando Iannucci, often featuring documentary-style inserts such as 'The Pool' and 'The Office'.
 Documentary Now! (2015–present) series on IFC, created by Saturday Night Live alumni Fred Armisen, Bill Hader, Seth Meyers, and director Rhys Thomas, which spoofs celebrated documentary films by parodying the style of each documentary with a similar, but fictitious, subject.
 Dog Bites Man, parody of local news coverage; follows the misadventures of a struggling news team as they travel around the country producing news segments.
 Dora the Explorer (live-action series), adventure series, follows a 16-year-old Dora Marquez and her high school friends, Boots the monkey, and her talking backpack on wild adventures, based on the animated series of the same name. It is being filmed and coming to Paramount+.
 Dorm Life (US, 2008–2009), webseries following the fictional lives of the inhabitants of the college dorm floor 5 South.
 Drama Club (2021), a comedy series where students at Tookus Middle School prepare for their musical.
 The Games (Australia, 1998 and 2000), comedy, follows the mayhem and bureaucratic snafu faced by the organisers of the 2000 Sydney Olympics.
 Gerhard Reinke's Wanderlust (US, 2003), travel show following the misadventures of a bumbling German backpacker as he travels the globe in search of reasonably priced culturally enriching experiences.
 Hardy Bucks (Ireland, 2010), small-town exploits of misbehaving young men.
 High School Musical: The Musical: The Series (2019-present), inspired by the High School Musical film series, the East High drama teacher decides to stage a performance of High School Musical: The Musical for her first winter theater production to celebrate the school's affiliation with the original films. The students cast in the musical learn to navigate their interpersonal relationships and form bonds with each other, to overcome the challenges they face in their lives at school and home.
 Hoff the Record (UK, 2015), fly-on-the wall series starring David Hasselhoff.
 Human Remains (UK, 2000), a bleak series of fly-on-the-wall insights into dysfunctional couples.
 In de gloria (Belgium, 2000–2001), a tragicomical sketch show parodying reality television and human interest shows.
 Les Invincibles (Canada, 2005–2009), French Canadian dramedy about four thirty-year-old men signing a pact that says they have to break up with their girlfriends and embrace a common routine-free life.
 Ja'mie: Private School Girl (Australia, 2013), 6 episodes about a very rich year 12 schoolgirl prefect called Ja'mie King, and her friends and enemies.
 Jonah from Tonga (Australia, 2014), 6 episodes about a year 9 bully of Tongan descent called Jonah Takalua, and his life after he was expelled from Summer Heights High.
 Jimmy MacDonald's Canada (Canada, 2005), lost episodes of a mid-1960s public affairs show hosted by Jimmy MacDonald who was played by Richard Waugh; combined new segments with authentic news and human interest archive footage.
 Kupa Rashit (Israel, 2018-present), about a group of dysfunctional supermarket employees always causing mischief at their workplace.
 The Life of Rock with Brian Pern (UK, 2014-2017) created by Rhys Thomas stars Simon Day as rock musician Brian Pern, frontman of the progressive rock band Thotch.
 Little Lunch (TV series) (Australia, 2015) created by Robyn Butler and Wayne Hope on ABC Me set in a suburban primary school in Australia and follows the adventures of six Grade 5 students at recess time. 
 Look Around You (UK, 2002 and 2005), parody of educational TV (season 1) and documentary about "the world and future of science and technology" (season 2), set roughly 25 years before the actual release dates.
 Lunatics (Australia, 2019–present), the series explores the lives of six different and eccentric characters in their own distinctive settings.
 Marion and Geoff (UK series, 2000–2003), stars Rob Brydon as a cab driver.
 Modern Family (US, 2009–2020), about three families living modern American lives.
 My Generation (TV series) (US, 2010), about a group of high school classmates ten years after graduation.
 My Life as Liz (US, 2010–2011), about a seventeen-year-old girl and her senior year in high school.
 The Muppets (US, 2015–2016), mockumentary style of muppets characters. 
 The Naked Brothers Band (US, 2007–2009), starred two real-life brothers Nat and Alex Wolff and their real life friends.
 The Office (UK/USA, 2001–2013), British satire on white-collar management, later remade for US and other audiences.
 Operation Good Guys, British satire of an incompetent police force (often seen as a precursor to The Office).
 Parks and Recreation (US, 2009–2015), follows Leslie Knope, head of the Parks and Recreation department in a small town in Indiana.
 Paths to Freedom (Ireland, 2000), fly-on-the-wall spoof about two prisoners leaving prison, both from different backgrounds, one an esteemed gynaecologist and the other an inner-city Dublin rapper.
 People Just Do Nothing, BBC mockumentary following the men who run Kurupt FM, a pirate radio station broadcasting garage and drum and bass in London.
 People Like Us (UK, radio 1995–1997, and television 1999-2001), British comedy featuring an inept interviewer (played by Chris Langham) who interviews people in various jobs.
 Pepito Manaloto: Ang Tunay na Kuwento (Pepito Manaloto: The Real Story) (Philippines, 2010–present), a multi-awarded Filipino comedy series.
 Players (US, 2022–present) follows a fictional League of Legends esports team trying to win a championship.
 Prehistoric Park (UK, 2006), six-episode mockumentary that depicts a hypothetical scenario whereby a time machine is used to create a wildlife park.
 Pure Pwnage, an Internet-distributed show about a gamer followed around by his brother; created by Geoff Lapaire and Jarett Cale.
 Real Husbands of Hollywood (US, 2013–2016), created by and starring Kevin Hart, shown on BET.
 Reno 911! (US, 2003–2009), Comedy Central parody of Cops, about an inept police force in Reno, Nevada.
 Review (US, 2014–2017), Comedy Central show starring Andy Daly as fictional professional critic Forrest MacNeil, who reviews real-life experiences.
 Sono 'Okodawari', Watashi ni mo Kure yo!! (Japan, 2016), based on a manga series.
 Southern Fried Stings, depicting a group of mercenaries/private detectives operating in the southern United States.
 Summer Heights High (Australia, 2007), about three characters at a public high school.
 This Country (UK, 2017–present), comedy series about the day-to-day lives of two young people living in a small village in the Cotswolds. Later remade for the US.
 Total Drama (Canada, 2007–2014), animated parody of reality shows, about a group of teens competing for $1,000,000.
 Trailer Park Boys (Canada, 2001–present), follows Julian, Ricky, and Bubbles, as they commit crimes and hatch crackpot schemes to make money, most of which are illegal and often involve growing marijuana.
 Trial & Error (US, 2017–2018), a parody of true crime documentaries which follows the cases of Josh Segal, a New York transplant who moves to East Peck, South Carolina to take the case of Larry Henderson.
 Victoria Wood: As Seen on TV (UK, 1985–87), two series of sketch shows with regular five-minute mockumentaries, written by and starring Victoria Wood.
 We Can Be Heroes: Finding The Australian of the Year (Australia, 2005), about five fictitious candidates nominated for the prestigious Australian of the Year Award.
 Welcome to Flatch (US, 2022), about life in small-town Ohio.
 Wellington Paranormal (New Zealand, 2018-2022), comedy-horror series about a group of paranormal detectives, spin-off of 2014 film What We Do in the Shadows.
 What We Do in the Shadows (TV series) (US, 2019–present), comedy-horror series about a group of vampires living in Staten Island, spin-off of 2014 film of the same name.
 Wildboyz (US, 2003–2006), Jackass spin-off, starring Steve-O and Chris Pontius; mocks nature documentaries.
 Yacht Rock (US, 2005–2010), Channel 101 series following the fictionalized lives and careers of American soft rock stars of the late 1970s and early 1980s.
 Zach Stone Is Gonna Be Famous (US, 2013), follows a teenager who hires a camera crew to document his journey to overnight stardom, despite being completely talentless.

 Specials and one-offs 

 The Gist, one-off arts review show parody written by John Morton; presented by Robert Webb; featuring Amelia Bulmore, Bill Nighy.
 Introducing Tony Ferrino: Who and Why?: A Quest, Steve Coogan's parody of cheap promotional videos which went alongside the arrival of his Portuguese singer character; written with Peter Baynham, co-writer of Borat, The Day Today, who appears as an interviewer eventually killed by the sinister Ferrino.
 Larry David: Curb Your Enthusiasm, HBO Special about the making of an HBO special.
 MyMusic (US, 2012), web series about a dysfunctional music company.
 The Naked Brothers Band: The Movie, stars two real-life brothers Nat and Alex Wolff and their real-life friends.
 Norbert Smith - a Life, a personal project by English comedian Harry Enfield, satirising TV arts show biographies, British films of the 20th century, and the British acting fraternity; Enfield later provided two other mockumentaries, Smashie and Nicey: The End of an Era (which took us through the glory days of British radio) and Normal Ormal: A Very Political Turtle (a scatter-gun attack on politics).
 Oil Gobblers (Ropáci), a film by Jan Svěrák about creatures that live in underground mines and feed on oil, plastic, and rubbish.
 Platinum Weird, a band formed by Dave Stewart and Kara DioGuardi, and the subject of a VH1 mockumentary.

Commercials

 ESPN's "This is SportsCenter" commercials are presented in a mockumentary style.

 Television specials 

 Alternative 3, TV movie of a political conspiracy to establish a settlement on Mars.
 Galaxy Quest: 20th Anniversary, The Journey Continues (1999), a promotional mockumentary aired on E! which presented the Galaxy Quest television series as an actual cult series, and the upcoming film as a documentary about the making of the series featuring fake interviews of the series' cast, "Questerians", and critics. This is not to be confused with Never Surrender: A Galaxy Quest Documentary (film), a 2019 documentary about the film.
 The Great Martian War 1913–1917 (2013), TV production depicting an alternate history in which the world fought invaders from the planet Mars, rather than the actual historical participants, during World War I.
 How to Irritate People, a 1968 TV broadcast predating Monty Python, but written mostly by John Cleese and Graham Chapman while also featuring Michael Palin and Terry Jones.
 Pat Paulsen for President (1968), TV special about the fictional presidential campaign of comedian Pat Paulsen.
 Space Oddyssey: Voyage to the Planets, about a fictional crewed voyage through the Solar System, presented in documentary style.
 Tout ça (ne nous rendra pas la Belgique), a hoax news bulletin on a French-medium Belgian television network that claimed the Flemish parliament had unilaterally declared independence from Belgium; known in English as the Flemish Secession hoax.

 Individual episodes 

Sometimes an episode of an otherwise non-mockumentary series is presented as a mockumentary.
 3rd Rock from the Sun
 "The Loud Solomon Family: a Dickumentary", season 5, an episode presented in an entirely documentary style, taking a look into the lives of the Solomon family.
 Babylon 5
 "And Now for a Word" (1995), framed as a documentary by the fictional news network ISN for the Babylon 5 station; every act in the episode starts with effects similar to those used by news channels, and ends with the reporter acknowledging the cut to advertisements; there is also a fake advertisement; this is the first documentary-styled episode in the science fiction genre.
 "The Illusion of Truth" and "The Deconstruction of Falling Stars", season 4, partially employ documentary style.
 Blue Mountain State 
 "One Week" (2011), a documentary crew follows the team on and off the field. Episode made to look like a mockumentary and presented as such.
 Bones
 "The Movie in the Making" (2016), made to look like an episode of fictional documentary TV show focusing on the work of the FBI and Jeffersonian Institute, including interviews with characters.
 The Comic Strip Presents
 "The Comic Strip Presents... Bad News Tour" and its sequel, "More Bad News", following an incompetent rock group on tour.
 "The Comic Strip Presents... Eddie Monsoon: A Life?", the life story of an offensive talk show host.
 Community
 "Intermediate Documentary Filmmaking", Pierce tells the study group he's dying and asks Abed to film his last wishes.
 Entourage
 "Welcome to the Jungle" (2007), an episode as a mock "making of" film about Medellín, the film the characters produce.
 ER
 "Ambush", 1997 live episode, portrayed as a documentary.
 Escape the Night
 "Monsters of Everlock" (2018), an episode that delves into the different monsters that were featured in the show. It's stated at the start that it takes place before the events of the show and that the crew behind were never seen again.
 Even Stevens
 "Band on the Roof", a "rockumentary"-style episode following the band the Twitty-Steven Connection.
 Family Guy
 "Inside Family Guy", a "behind-the-scenes"-style episode on the making of the show.
 Farscape
 "A Constellation of Doubt", Season 4, Episode 17, most of the episode comprises a fictional documentary detailing humanity's reaction to Moya's recent visit to Earth; it is occasionally seen that John Crichton is watching the documentary on a television set in his quarters on board the ship; end credits of the episode include a trailer to the next episode of the fictional documentary.
 Grey's Anatomy
 "These Arms of Mine", a documentary crew visits the hospital six months after a shooting to document the road to recovery for doctors and patients.
 House
 "Ugly", Season 4, Episode 7, A camera follows a patient around the hospital as Dr. House treats him. Some of the episode is filmed in the standard format (such times include differentials etc.) but scenes including the patient are mostly viewed through the in-show camera. The cameras are differentiated by the official camera being in colour and the in-show camera being in grayscale.
 Just Shoot Me!
 "A&E Biography: Nina Van Horn", a faux A&E Biography of the character played by Wendie Malick.
 Monk
 "Mr. Monk’s 100th Case" (2008) 100th episode featuring a fictional TV special (mockumentary style) about Monk's 100th case including interviews with past characters on the show. Core characters are at a viewing party (standard format) for the special and Monk has second thoughts about his conclusion about the case.
 Night Court
 "A Closer Look", 1990 episode showing the affairs of the show from a news TV perspective.
Raising Hope 
 "Modern Wedding", Season 3, Episode 14, Sabrina's mother hires the film crew of her favorite show, Modern Family, to document her wedding as a wedding gift to Sabrina and Jimmy.
 The Simpsons
 "Behind the Laughter" (2000), a Behind the Music-style exposé.
 Stargate SG-1 had several episodes mocking itself and the sci-fi genre.
Wormhole X-Treme!, 100th episode with a show-within-a-show which is a parody of itself.
Stargate SG-1: The Lowdown, a behind the scenes look ahead of the seventh season, proceeded the premiere of Fallen (Stargate SG-1)
200, 200th episode with many imagined storylines of themselves.
 WandaVision
 "Breaking the Fourth Wall" (2020), homage to early mockumentary sitcoms like Modern Family and The Office (American TV series).
 The West Wing
 "Access" (2004), fake behind-the-scenes documentary about a day in the White House of President Josiah Bartlet, supposedly released after his term in office has ended.
 The X-Files
 "X-Cops" (2000), episode made to look like an episode of the actual show COPS.

 Other mock films and television 

 Reality shows 

 The Comeback (US, 2005), a reality show type following the life of former "it" actress Valerie Cherish.
 Double the Fist, fictional version of Jackass.
 Drawn Together, cartoon version of The Surreal Life.
 V/H/S/99: Ozzy's Dungeon (2022), A dangerous children's TV game show called "Ozzy's Dungeon," whose prize is a wish granted by the mysterious Ozzy, is canceled after a contestant is permanently injured. Year's later, the parents of the injured girl kidnap the former show's host and force him to endure a similar, yet deadlier, obstacle gauntlet in their basement — and discover the true nature of Ozzy.
 Series 7: The Contenders, a movie is presented as a marathon of the seventh series of an American reality television show in which six people, picked at random from a national lottery, are each given a gun and forced to hunt and kill each other for the camera.
 Siberia, a horror/drama series about a fictional reality television show in which 16 contestants must survive in the remote Siberian territory of Tunguska for a 500,000 dollar prize; things go horribly wrong and the contestants are left stranded in a dangerous forest full of things they don't understand.
 Southland Bounty Hunters, a fictional reality television show in which writer, actor, producer, and director Patrick Thomas portrays the imaginary bounty hunter Patty Mayo who works for the fictional Southland Bounty Hunters. Patrick Thomas also portrays the same character playing the role of a Sherriff in an equally fictional sherriffs department.

 News shows 

 Countdown to Looking Glass (1984), a cable-TV docu-drama presented as a series of news reports concerning an escalation in the Middle East between the US and the USSR, that eventually leads to nuclear war (not completely a documentary/mockumentary, as it includes dramatic interludes).
 Ghostwatch (1992), BBC television special in which a fictitious "live" paranormal investigation goes awry.
 Local 58 (2015–2022), a web series and spin-off of Kris Straub's Candle Cove, hosted on the YouTube channel LOCAL58TV''', each video in the series is presented as footage of a fictional public access television channel, which is continuously hijacked over a period of decades with a series of ominous and surreal broadcasts.
 Special Bulletin (1983), NBC made-for-TV movie, portrayed a live broadcast from a fictional American broadcasting network on a nuclear terrorism incident in Charleston, South Carolina as it occurred; its realism caused a minor panic in Charleston at the time of its first airing, despite disclaimers shown after each commercial break.
 V/H/S/94: Storm Drain (2021), a film segment in the form of cable news reports; covered the details of an urban legend cryptid known as the "Rat Man" who lives in the storm drains, only to be attacked by sewer-dwelling people who worship the humanoid and bring the news crew to it for sacrifice.
 Without Warning (1994), TV film in the form of a mock newscast, produced by CBS; covered an apocalyptic alien attack scenario as seen through the eyes of a network TV news crew; like Special Bulletin, reports of panic were also associated with its broadcast.

 Found footage 

Some films and shows take the form of (fake) raw footage.
 Be My Cat: A Film for Anne, 2015 horror movie about a young man in Romania who goes to shocking extremes to convince Hollywood actress Anne Hathaway to play in his film.
 The Blair Witch Project, 1999 horror film about three student filmmakers who disappear while hiking to film a documentary about a local legend, the Blair Witch. 
 Cannibal Holocaust, 1980 horror film about an anthropologist from New York University who leads a rescue team into the Amazon rainforest to locate a crew of filmmakers.
 Chronicle, 2012 science fiction movie about three high-school seniors who form a bond after gaining telekinetic abilities from an unknown object. 
 Cloverfield, 2008 monster thriller film following six young New Yorkers attending a going-away party on the night a gigantic monster attacks the city. 
 Creep (film series) (2014–2017), American psychological horror films about videographers recording eccentric people. A third film, currently titled Creep 3, is being made.
 The Devil Inside, 2012 horror movie tracing the purported exorcism of a possessed woman convicted of a triple murder. 
 End of Watch, 2012 action thriller film focused on the day-to-day work of two Los Angeles Police Department officers.
 Gang Tapes, 2001 When a brutal carjacking yields a videocamera, a teenage boy decides to document his life and the lives of his fellow gangbangers.
 The Last Exorcism, 2010 horror film about a fictional evangelical minister who participates in a documentary that films his exorcism. 
 Paranormal Activity, 2007 supernatural horror film centered on a young couple who are haunted by a supernatural presence in their home. 
 Project X,  2012 comedy film whose plot follows three friends who plan to gain popularity by throwing a party, a plan which quickly escalates out of their control. 
 [•REC] (film series) (2007–2014), Spanish supernatural zombie horror film franchise. Mainly the first two ones – [•REC] (2007) and [•REC]² (2009) – are found footage films. 
 September Tapes, 2004 movie about a man who hunts down Osama Bin Laden. 
 The Troll Hunter, 2010 Norwegian comedy-drama film made by a team of film students, documenting the work of a troll hunter with the secret Norwegian Troll Service. 
 V/H/S (film series) (2012–2014), American anthology horror films featuring a series of found-footage shorts.
 Zero Day'', 2003 American indie film by Ben Coccio based on the Columbine High School shooting.

References 

Mockumentary

Documentary-related lists